The Manchurian Candidate is a novel by Richard Condon, first published in 1959. It is a political thriller about the son of a prominent U.S. political family who is brainwashed into being an unwitting assassin for a Communist conspiracy.

The novel has twice been adapted into a feature film with the same title: the first was released in 1962 and the second in 2004.

Plot summary
Major Bennett Marco, Sergeant Raymond Shaw, and the rest of their infantry platoon are captured by an elite Soviet commando unit during the Korean War in 1952. They are taken to Manchuria, and brainwashed into believing Shaw saved their lives in combat – for which Shaw is subsequently awarded the Medal of Honor.

Years after the war, Marco, now back in the United States working as an intelligence officer, begins suffering a recurring nightmare in which the seated platoon members are surrounded by a group of sweet little old ladies who had been a part of their brainwashing.  One of the ladies tells Sergeant Shaw to murder two of his platoon comrades.  The backdrop with the old ladies changes back and forth between them and Chinese/Soviet intelligence officials. When Marco learns that another of the platoon's soldiers has been suffering the exact same nightmare, he starts looking into why this is happening.

Major Marco looks up Sergeant Raymond Shaw and discovers that Shaw's new manservant is someone he recognizes from Korea. Marco and the manservant start fighting in Shaw's house and both are bloodied significantly. Marco is arrested, and when Shaw sees that it is his old major they rekindle their old friendship. Both find love interests: for Marco, it is Rose Cheyney, whom he meets on a train; and for Raymond, it is Jocelyn Jordan, the daughter of Senator Thomas Jordan, a neighbor of Shaw's. Senator Jordan and Shaw's mother do not like each other, but Raymond continues to see Jocelyn.

It is revealed that the Communists have been using Shaw as a sleeper agent who, activated by a post-hypnotic trigger, immediately forgets the assignments he carries out and therefore can never betray the operation either purposely or inadvertently. In Shaw's case, the suggestion that he play solitaire is the trigger. Seeing the queen of diamonds playing card transforms him into an assassin who will kill anyone at whom he is directed. Shaw's KGB handler is his domineering mother, Eleanor. Married to McCarthy-esque Senator Johnny Iselin, Eleanor has convinced the Communist powers to help install her husband as president and allow them to control the American government through him.

By observing Shaw, Marco discovers the trigger shortly before the national convention of Iselin's political party. He uses the queen of diamonds card to draw out Eleanor's plan: after she obtains the vice presidential nomination for Iselin, Shaw is to shoot the presidential candidate so that Iselin can succeed him. Blaming the killing on the Communists will enable Iselin to assume dictatorial powers. Marco reprograms Shaw, although it is unclear until the final pages whether this is successful. At the convention, Shaw instead shoots and kills his mother and Senator Iselin. Marco is the first person to reach Shaw's sniper nest, getting there just before Shaw turns the gun on himself and commits suicide.

Alleged plagiarism
In 1998, software developer C. J. Silverio noted that several long passages of the novel seemed to be adapted from Robert Graves's 1934 novel I, Claudius. Forensic linguist John Olsson judged that "There can be no disputing that Richard Condon plagiarized from Robert Graves." Olsson went on to state that "As plagiarists go, Condon is quite creative, he does not confine himself to one source and is prepared to throw other ingredients into the pot."  Jonathan Lethem, in his influential essay "The Ecstasy of Influence: A Plagiarism", has included Condon's novels as "texts that become troubling to their admirers after the discovery of their 'plagiarized' elements".

Film adaptations
The book has twice been adapted into a feature film of the same title. The Manchurian Candidate (1962) is considered a classic of the political thriller genre. It was directed by John Frankenheimer and starred Laurence Harvey as Shaw, Frank Sinatra as Marco, and Angela Lansbury as Eleanor in an Academy Award-nominated performance.

The Manchurian Candidate (2004) was directed by Jonathan Demme, and starred Liev Schreiber as Shaw, Denzel Washington as Marco, and Meryl Streep as Eleanor. It was generally well received by critics, and moderately successful at the box office.  The film updated the conflict (and brainwashing) to the Persian Gulf War in 1991, had a U.S. corporation (called "Manchurian Global") as the perpetrator of the brainwashing and conspiracy instead of foreign Communist groups, and dropped the Johnny Iselin character in favor of making both Shaw and his mother elected politicians.

Both adaptations discard several elements of the book. The book spends more time describing the brainwashers and the facility in Manchuria where the Americans were held. The head of the project grants Raymond a "gift"; after his brainwashing, he becomes quite sexually active, in contrast to his reserved nature beforehand where he had not even kissed his love interest, Jocelyn Jordan.

In the novel, Mrs. Iselin and her son travel abroad, where she uses him to kill various political figures and possibly Jocelyn Jordan's first husband. Rosie, Marco's love interest, is the ex-fiancée of one of his associates handling the Shaw case for Army Intelligence, making things between the couple tense. The movie adaptations also all but omit the novel's portrayal of incest between Raymond and his mother, only hinting at it with a mouth-to-mouth kiss.

As a child, Mrs. Iselin was sexually abused by her father, but fell in love with him and idolized him after his early death. Towards the end of the book, as Raymond is hypnotized by the Queen of Diamonds, he reminds her of her father and they sleep together.

The 1962 version does not state outright the political affiliation of Senators Iselin and Jordan (implied to be Republicans), although in the 2004 film the equivalent characters are Democrats.  According to David Willis McCullough, Senator Iselin is modeled on Republican senator Joseph McCarthy and, according to Condon, Shaw's mother is based on McCarthy's counsel Roy Cohn.

Other adaptations
A stage adaptation by John Lahr opened in London in 1991, and has since played in the United States.

Kevin Puts has adapted the work into an opera.  His opera The Manchurian Candidate premiered in March 2015 at the Minnesota Opera. It has been performed by the Austin Opera and at the Seagle Festival in the Adirondacks of New York.

In popular culture

A copy of The Manchurian Candidate is a major plot point in the 1999 novel False Memory by Dean Koontz.

The novel's title is referenced in many TV shows:
 Gravity Falls episode "The Stanchurian Candidate", aired as part of the series' second season.
 Rick and Morty'''s season 3 episode "The Rickchurian Mortydate".
 Family Guy's season 21 episode "The Munchurian Candidate".

In the season 4 episode "Chuck versus Phase Three" of the TV series Chuck, the protagonist compares his experience of remembering dreams to The Manchurian Candidate.

See also

List of assassinations in fiction
Conspiracy thriller
Brainwashing

Notes

References
 Condon, Richard, December 28, 1963. Manchurian Candidate' in Dallas", The Nation.
 Loken, John (2000). Oswald's Trigger Films: The Manchurian Candidate, We Were Strangers, Suddenly?, pp. 16, 36.
 

External links

 Photos of the first edition of The Manchurian Candidate
 Review: The Manchurian Candidate
 The Manchurian Candidate at complete review
 ‘Manchurian Candidate’ in Dallas December 28, 1963, article by Richard Condon in The Nation about the JFK assassination and The Manchurian Candidate''

1959 American novels
American novels adapted into films
Fiction about mind control
Novels set during the Korean War
Novels about elections
Novels by Richard Condon
Political thriller novels
Novels about McCarthyism
American political novels
Novels involved in plagiarism controversies
Matricide in fiction